Steven R. Cishek (born June 18, 1986) is an American former professional baseball pitcher. Cishek played in Major League Baseball (MLB) for the Florida / Miami Marlins, St. Louis Cardinals, Seattle Mariners, Tampa Bay Rays, Chicago Cubs, Chicago White Sox, Los Angeles Angels and Washington Nationals. He holds the Marlins franchise record for consecutive saves, with 33 in a row.

Amateur career
Born and raised in Falmouth, Massachusetts, Cishek attended Falmouth High School where he starred as a pitcher and also played basketball. Not heavily recruited out of high school by Division I schools, Cishek attended Division II Carson-Newman College in Jefferson City, Tennessee, and led the team to a conference championship in 2007.

Professional career

Florida / Miami Marlins
The Florida Marlins selected Cishek in the fifth round of the 2007 MLB draft. Cishek was called up to the MLB for the first time on September 20, 2010. He pitched  scoreless innings towards the end of the season.

On May 24, 2011, Cishek was called up once again to join the Marlins after Jay Buente was designated for assignment. In 2012, Heath Bell was demoted as the team's closer and Cishek assumed the role for about a week. After a few relief appearances by Bell, he regained the closer's role. After about two months as the closer, Bell was demoted to a relief pitcher and Cishek took over the closer role again.

Cishek flourished in 2013, his first full season as Miami's closer, converting 34 of his 36 save opportunities, while posting a 2.33 ERA and 1.08 WHIP. He played with Miami again in 2014 and 2015. On June 1, 2015, Cishek was optioned to Double-A Jacksonville to work on his mechanics. To that point in the season, he had posted a 6.98 ERA with 17 strikeouts and 10 walks.

St. Louis Cardinals
On July 24, 2015, Cishek was traded to the St. Louis Cardinals for RHP Kyle Barraclough.  He debuted for the Cardinals on July 26 in a 3–2 loss to the Atlanta Braves, pitching one scoreless inning but being charged with an error on a pickoff attempt. The Cardinals did not tender Cishek a contract for the 2016 season, making him a free agent.

Seattle Mariners
On December 14, 2015, Cishek agreed to a two-year contract worth $10 million with the Seattle Mariners. After going 25 for 31 in save opportunities, the Mariners removed Cishek as closer for a temporary basis. On August 5, he was placed on the disabled list with a hip injury.

Tampa Bay Rays

On July 28, 2017, the Mariners traded Cishek to the Tampa Bay Rays for Erasmo Ramírez.

Chicago Cubs
On December 16, 2017, Cishek signed a two-year, $13 million contract with the Chicago Cubs. On August 20, 2019, he was reactivated from the Triple-A  Iowa Cubs.

Chicago White Sox
On January 14, 2020, Cishek signed a one-year deal with the Chicago White Sox. With the 2020 Chicago White Sox, Cishek appeared in 22 games, compiling a 0–0 record with 5.40 ERA and 21 strikeouts in 20.0 innings pitched. Cishek was designated for the assignment by the White Sox on September 24. He was released by the organization on September 28.

Houston Astros

On February 9, 2021, Cishek signed a minor league contract with the Houston Astros organization that included an invitation to Spring Training. On March 25, 2021, Cishek requested and was granted his release.

Los Angeles Angels
On March 29, 2021, Cishek signed a one-year, $1 million contract with the Los Angeles Angels.

Washington Nationals
On March 14, 2022, Cishek signed a one-year contract with the Washington Nationals.

Player profile
His secondary pitch is a slider in the  range, a pitch he uses more commonly against right-handed hitters. Cishek features his slider liberally in two-strike counts, especially 1–2.

Personal life
Cishek married Marissa (Mitchell) Cishek in November 2012. The couple have three daughters together. Cishek is a Christian. Growing up in Massachusetts, Cishek was a fan of the Boston Red Sox.

References

External links

1986 births
Living people
Arkansas Travelers players
Baseball players from Massachusetts
Carson–Newman Eagles baseball players
Chicago Cubs players
Chicago White Sox players
Everett AquaSox players
Florida Marlins players
Greensboro Grasshoppers players
Jacksonville Suns players
Jamestown Jammers players
Jupiter Hammerheads players
Los Angeles Angels players
Major League Baseball pitchers
Miami Marlins players
New Orleans Zephyrs players
People from Falmouth, Massachusetts
Phoenix Desert Dogs players
Seattle Mariners players
St. Louis Cardinals players
Tacoma Rainiers players
Tampa Bay Rays players
Washington Nationals players
World Baseball Classic players of the United States
2013 World Baseball Classic players
Falmouth High School (Massachusetts) alumni